The 1919 Rhode Island Rams football team was an American football team that represented Rhode Island State College (later renamed the University of Rhode Island) as an independent during the 1919 college football season. In its first and only season under head coach Fred Murray, the team compiled a 0–7–1 record and was outscored by a total of 168 to 31.

Schedule

References

Rhode Island State
Rhode Island Rams football seasons
College football winless seasons
Rhode Island State Rams football